Barotac Nuevo–Dumangas–Dacutan Wharf Road is a , national secondary road in the province of Iloilo, Philippines. It connects the municipalities of Barotac Nuevo and Dumangas and provides fast access to the Port of Dumangas.

The entire road is designated as National Route 655 (N655) of the Philippine highway network. It is the also only secondary road in Panay Island to be part of the 600-series, as every other secondary route are on the 500-series.

Route description

Intersections

References

Roads in Iloilo